Motilal Ray (February, 1843 - 1908) also known as Mati Ray was a Bengali actor, director, and writer. He popularized the Jatra Gan by composing simple fluent and elegant ballads. He revived the old tradition in a new way. Under his influence, Krishna Lila Jatra came to be known as ‘Puratan' old.

Biography

Early days 
Motilal Ray was born on 21 Magh of 1249 Bangabda (in February 1843) in the village of Bhatsala in Bardhaman district (now in Purba Bardhaman district). His father was Manohar Ray and mother was Kashishwari debi. After starting his studies in the village school, he came to Nabadwip and completed his primary studies from Nabadwip Missionary School. He later studied in Barasat High School.

Professional career 
With the help of Madhab Chowdhury, Motilal Ray began his career as a teacher in the Missionary School in Nabadwip. Within a few days, he got a service at Jorasanko police station and went there. And within a few months he got a good job in Calcutta G.P.O. and moved there.

He had a hobby of writing poetry since childhood. When he met Ishwar Gupta, the editor of Sambad Prabhakar, one day he got a chance to write poetry there. Later, he got a chance to write for Hari Narayan Babu's Jatra Dal. Then he began to earn and acquired a great reputation by holding Jatra performances with Hari Narayan. Two plays of Motilal ‘‘Tarani Sen Badh’’ and ‘‘Ram Bano Bash’’ or ‘‘Ram Biday’’ were performed in Hari Narayan's Jatra.

In 1873, Motilal formed his own Jatra Party in Nabadwip as Nabadwip Banga Gitabhinay Sampraday. His troupe was more popularly known as Motirayer Dol or Moti Ray's Troupe. Motilal Ray changed the style and narratives of Jatra, introducing a modern identity. He transformed Jatra much closer to the style of theater, introducing Geetabhinoy (acting through singing) in Jatra.

Bibliography

Plays and Jatra 

 Ramayani
 Tarani Sen Badh (Plays)
 Ram Banabas or Ram Biday (1873)
 Sitaharan (1878)
 Ram Raja
 Lakkhman Bhojan
 Raban Badh
 Sita Anneshan
 Ram Parinata

 About Mahabharat
 Bharat Milan or Bharat Agaman (1888)
 Draupadir Vastra Haran (1881)
 Pandab Nirbasan
 Bhishma's Sharashajjya
 Karnabadh
 Yudhusthirer Rajyabhishek (1900)
 Yudhusthirer Ashbmamedh

 Krishnalila
 Kaliya Sarpadaman
 Brojolila (1894)
 Gayasurer Haripadpadnia Labh

 Others Mythology
 Jagannath's Māhātmya or Kṣētradhāmēra Māhātmya
 Subachani Māhātmya

 Loukik Kahini and Brotokotha
 Nemai Sannyasa
 Vijay Chandi (1880)
 Mahalila

References 

1843 births
1908 deaths
Bengali writers
Bengali-language writers
19th-century Indian dramatists and playwrights
Indian male stage actors
19th-century Indian male actors
Bengali theatre personalities
People from British India